Andreas Larem (born 25 September 1964) is a German politician of the Social Democratic Party (SPD) who has been serving as a member of the Bundestag since 2021.

Political career
Larem became a member of the Bundestag in the 2021 elections, representing the Darmstadt district. 

In parliament, Larem has since been serving on the Committee on Foreign Affairs and its Subcommittee on the United Nations, International Organizations and Civil Crisis Prevention.

In addition to his committee assignments, Larem is part of the German Parliamentary Friendship Group for Relations with the States of South Asia.

Other activities
 German Poland Institute (DPI), Member of the Board of Trustees (since 2022)

References 

Living people
1992 births
Social Democratic Party of Germany politicians
Members of the Bundestag 2021–2025
21st-century German politicians